The 2022 Milwaukee Brewers season was the 53rd season for the Brewers in Milwaukee, the 25th in the National League, and 54th overall.

On December 2, 2021, Commissioner of Baseball Rob Manfred announced a lockout of players, following expiration of the collective bargaining agreement (CBA) between the league and the Major League Baseball Players Association (MLBPA). On March 10, 2022, the MLB and MLBPA agreed to a new collective bargaining agreement, thus ending the lockout. Opening Day was played on April 7. Although MLB previously announced that several series would be cancelled due to the lockout, the agreement provides for a 162-game season, with originally canceled games to be made up via doubleheaders.

The Brewers were eliminated from playoff contention for the first time since 2017 on October 3rd.

Offseason

Lockout 

The expiration of the league's collective bargaining agreement (CBA) with the Major League Baseball Players Association occurred on December 1, 2021 with no new agreement in place. As a result, the team owners voted unanimously to lockout the players stopping all free agency and trades. 

The parties came to an agreement on a new CBA on March 10, 2022.

Rule changes 
Pursuant to the new CBA, several new rules were instituted for the 2022 season. The National League will adopt the designated hitter full-time, a draft lottery will be implemented, the postseason will expand from ten teams to twelve, and advertising patches will appear on player uniforms and helmets for the first time.

Season standings

National League Central

National League Wild Card

Record vs. opponents

Roster

Transactions

April 

 On April 7, traded Hayden Cantrelle to Miami Marlins for Alex Jackson.
 On April 13, traded Jamie Westbrook to Detroit Tigers for cash.
 On April 19, traded Dustin Peterson to Philadelphia Phillies for cash.
 On April 23, sent Luis Urias on rehab assignment to Double-A Biloxi.
 On April 29, placed Victor Caratini on 10-day injured list, recalled Alex Jackson from Triple-A Nashville.

May 

 On May 1, activated Victor Caratini from 10-day injured list, placed Jake Cousins on 10-day injured list.
 On May 2, optioned Mike Brosseau to Triple-A Nashville, optioned Alex Jackson to Triple-A Nashville, designated Jose Urena for assignment, activated Luis Urias.
 On May 6, selected Luis Perdomo from Triple-A Nashville, optioned Keston Hiura to Triple-A Nashville.
 On May 7, recalled Mike Brosseau from Triple-A Nashville, placed Andrew McCutchen on 10-day injured list.
 On May 9, sent Jose Urena to Triple-A Nashville, activated Alec Bettinger. 
 On May 10, recalled J.C. Mejia from Triple-A Nashville, optioned Jandel Gustave to Triple-A Nashville.
 On May 13, recalled Jandel Gustave from Triple-A Nashville, placed Brent Suter on paternity list.
 On May 16, activated Brent Suter from paternity list, placed Jandel Gustave on 15-day injured list.
 On May 17, selected Trevor Kelley from Triple-A Nashville, placed J.C. Mejia on restricted list.
 On May 18, recalled Keston Hiura from Triple-A Nashville, placed Willy Adames on 10-day injured list.
 On May 19, sent Alec Bettinger to Triple-A Nashville.
 On May 20, optioned Trevor Kelley to Triple-A Nashville, activated Andrew McCutchen from 10-day injured list.

Game log

Regular season

|-style=background:#fcc
| 1 || April 7 || @ Cubs || 4–5 || Martin (1–0) || Ashby (0–1) || Robertson (1) || 35,112 || 0–1 || L1
|-style=background:#bbb
| — || April 8 || @ Cubs || colspan=7| Postponed (inclement weather); Makeup: May 30
|-style=background:#fcc
| 2 || April 9 || @ Cubs || 0–9 || Steele (1–0) || Woodruff (0–1) || — || 30,369 || 0–2 || L2
|-style=background:#bfb
| 3 || April 10 || @ Cubs || 5–4 || Boxberger (1–0) || Norris (0–1) || Hader (1) || 32,858 || 1–2 || W1
|-style=background:#fcc
| 4 || April 11 || @ Orioles || 0–2 || Baumann (1–0) || Houser (0–1) || López (1) || 44,461 || 1–3 || L1
|-style=background:#bfb
| 5 || April 12 || @ Orioles || 5–4 || Milner (1–0) || Bautista (0–1) || Hader (2) || 11,814 || 2–3 || W1
|-style=background:#bfb
| 6 || April 13 || @ Orioles || 4–2 || Boxberger (2–0) || López (0–1) || Hader (3) || 12,704 || 3–3 || W2
|-style=background:#bfb
| 7 || April 14 || Cardinals || 5–1 || Woodruff (1–1) || Wainwright (1–1) || — || 42,794 || 4–3 || W3
|-style=background:#fcc
| 8 || April 15 || Cardinals || 1–10 || Mikolas (1–0) || Peralta (0–1) || — || 26,874 || 4–4 || L1
|-style=background:#fcc
| 9 || April 16 || Cardinals || 1–2 || Matz (1–1) || Houser (0–2) || Gallegos (2) || 26,356 || 4–5 || L2
|-style=background:#bfb
| 10 || April 17 || Cardinals || 6–5 || Cousins (1–0) || Hudson (0–1) || Hader (4) || 23,001 || 5–5 || W1
|-style=background:#bfb
| 11 || April 18 || Pirates || 6–1 || Lauer (1–0) || Thompson (0–1) || — || 21,512 || 6–5 || W2
|-style=background:#bfb
| 12 || April 19 || Pirates || 5–2 || Burnes (1–0) || Brubaker (0–2) || Hader (5) || 22,747 || 7–5 || W3
|-style=background:#bfb
| 13 || April 20 || Pirates || 4–2 || Woodruff (2–1) || Keller (0–3) || Hader (6) || 20,790 || 8–5 || W4
|-style=background:#fcc
| 14 || April 22 || @ Phillies || 2–4 || Nelson (1–0) || Ashby (0–2) || Knebel (3) || 29,285 || 8–6 || L1
|-style=background:#bfb
| 15 || April 23 || @ Phillies || 5–3 || Houser (1–2) || Wheeler (0–3) || Hader (7) || 30,612 || 9–6 || W1
|-style=background:#bfb
| 16 || April 24 || @ Phillies || 1–0 || Williams (1–0) || Knebel (0–1) || Hader (8) || 26,175 || 10–6 || W2
|-style=background:#fcc
| 17 || April 25 || Giants || 2–4 || McGee (1–1) || Cousins (2–1) || Doval (4) || 21,186 || 10–7 || L1
|-style=background:#bfb
| 18 || April 26 || @ Pirates || 12–8 || Suter (1–0) || Fletcher (0–1) || Hader (9) || 8,493 || 11–7 || W1
|-style=background:#bfb
| 19 || April 27 || @ Pirates || 3–1 || Gott (1–0) || Crowe (1–1) || Hader (10) || 8,331 || 12–7 || W2
|-style=background:#bfb
| 20 || April 28 || @ Pirates || 3–2 || Milner (2–0) || Stratton (0–1) || Williams (1) || 8,332 || 13–7 || W3
|-style=background:#bfb
| 21 || April 29 || Cubs || 11–1 || Houser (2–2) || Hendricks (1–2) || — || 29,062 || 14–7 || W4
|-style=background:#bfb
| 22 || April 30 || Cubs || 9–1 || Lauer (2–0) || Steele (1–3) || — || 37,263 || 15–7 || W5
|-

|-style=background:#fcc
| 23 || May 1 || Cubs || 0–2 || Stroman (1–3) || Burnes (1–1) || Robertson (5) || 35,137 || 15–8 || L1
|-style=background:#bfb
| 24 || May 3 || Reds || 6–3 || Woodruff (3–1) || Mahle (1–4) || Williams (2) || 21,961 || 16–8 || W1
|-style=background:#bfb
| 25 || May 4 || Reds || 18–4 || Peralta (1–1) || Gutiérrez (0–5) || — || 25,413 || 17–8 || W2
|-style=background:#bfb
| 26 || May 5 || Reds || 10–5 || Houser (3–2) || Greene (1–4) || — || 21,715 || 18–8 || W3
|-style=background:#bfb
| 27 || May 6 || @ Braves || 6–3 || Lauer (3–0) || McHugh (0–1) || Hader (11) || 36,307 || 19–8 || W4
|-style=background:#fcc
| 28 || May 7 || @ Braves || 2–3 || Fried (4–2) || Burnes (1–2) || Jansen (8) || 37,857 || 19–9 || L1
|-style=background:#fcc
| 29 || May 8 || @ Braves || 2–9 || Morton (2–3) || Ashby (0–3) || — || 36,551 || 19–10 || L2
|-style=background:#fcc
| 30 || May 9 || @ Reds || 5–10 || Cessa (1–0) || Woodruff (3–2) || — || 10,046 || 19–11 || L3
|-style=background:#bfb
| 31 || May 10 || @ Reds || 5–4 || Peralta (2–1) || Greene (1–5) || Hader (12) || 10,445 || 20–11 || W1
|-style=background:#fcc
| 32 || May 11 || @ Reds || 11–14 || Díaz (1–0) || Houser (3–3) || — || 11,851 || 20–12 || L1
|-style=background:#bfb
| 33 || May 13 || @ Marlins || 2–1 || Williams (2–0) || Scott (0–1) || Hader (13) || 9,110 || 21–12 || W1
|-style=background:#fcc
| 34 || May 14 || @ Marlins || 3–9 || Rogers (2–4) || Lauer (3–1) || — || 12,941 || 21–13 || L1
|-style=background:#bfb
| 35 || May 15 || @ Marlins || 7–3 || Woodruff (4–2) || Hernández (2–3) || Ashby (1) || 11,729 || 22–13 || W1
|-style=background:#bfb
| 36 || May 16 || Braves || 1–0 || Peralta (3–1) || Anderson (3–2) || Hader (14) || 25,880 || 23–13 || W2
|-style=background:#fcc
| 37 || May 17 || Braves || 0–3 || Davidson (1–0) || Houser (3–4) || Jansen (9) || 28,910 || 23–14 || L1
|-style=background:#bfb
| 38 || May 18 || Braves || 7–6  || Kelley (1–0) || Chavez (0–1) || — || 27,014 || 24–14 || W1
|-style=background:#bfb
| 39 || May 20 || Nationals || 7–0 || Lauer (4–1) || Fedde (2–3) || — || 29,609 || 25–14 || W2
|-style=background:#bfb
| 40 || May 21 || Nationals || 5–1 || Woodruff (5–2) || Corbin (0–7) || Hader (15) || 34,837 || 26–14 || W3
|-style=background:#fcc
| 41 || May 22 || Nationals || 2–8 || Sanchez (3–3) || Peralta (3–2) || — || 39,822 || 26–15 || L1
|-style=background:#fcc
| 42 || May 23 || @ Padres || 2–3  || García (3–2) || Sánchez (0–1) || — || 31,504 || 26–16 || L2
|-style=background:#bfb
| 43 || May 24 || @ Padres || 4–1 || Burnes (2–2) || Snell (0–2) || Williams (3) || 39,834 || 27–16 || W1
|-style=background:#bfb
| 44 || May 25 || @ Padres || 2–1 || Perdomo (1–0) || Darvish (4–2) || Williams (4) || 27,831 || 28–16 || W2
|-style=background:#bfb
| 45 || May 26 || @ Cardinals || 4–3 || Lauer (5–1) || Wainwright (5–4) || Hader (16) || 35,107 || 29–16 || W3
|-style=background:#fcc
| 46 || May 27 || @ Cardinals || 2–4 || VerHagen (2–0) || Woodruff (5–3) || Helsley (3) || 39,077 || 29–17 || L1
|-style=background:#fcc
| 47 || May 28 || @ Cardinals || 3–8 || Liberatore (1–0) || Houser (3–5) || — || 45,594 || 29–18 || L1
|-style=background:#bfb
| 48 || May 29 || @ Cardinals || 8–0 || Burnes (3–2) || Mikolas (3–3) || — || 44,169 || 30–18 || W1
|-style=background:#bfb
| 49 || May 30  || @ Cubs || 7–6 || Sánchez (1–1) || Norris (0–3) || Hader (17) || 39,305 || 31–18 || W2
|-style=background:#bfb
| 50 || May 30  || @ Cubs || 3–1 || Ashby (1–3) || Espinoza (0–1) || Hader (18) || 28,620 || 32–18 || W3
|-style=background:#fcc
| 51 || May 31 || @ Cubs || 7–8 || Givens (4–0) || Boxberger (1–1) || Robertson (7) || 30,596 || 32–19 || L1
|-

|-style=background:#fcc
| 52 || June 1 || @ Cubs || 3–4  || Leiter Jr. (1–1) || Milner (2–1) || — || 33,398 || 32–20 || L2
|-style=background:#bfb
| 53 || June 2 || Padres || 5–4 || Strzelecki (1–0) || Rogers (0–3) || — || 21,451 || 33–20 || W1
|-style=background:#fcc
| 54 || June 3 || Padres || 0–7 || Musgrove (6–0) || Burnes (3–3) || — || 30,019 || 33–21 || L1
|-style=background:#fcc
| 55 || June 4 || Padres || 0–4 || Gore (4–1) || Ashby (1–4) || — || 37,376 || 33–22 || L2
|-style=background:#fcc
| 56 || June 5 || Padres || 4–6  || Hill (1–0) || Gott (1–1) || Rogers (18) || 32,285 || 33–23 || L3
|-style=background:#fcc
| 57 || June 7 || Phillies || 2–3 || Brogdon (1–0) || Hader (0–1) || Knebel (10) || 27,109 || 33–24 || L4
|-style=background:#fcc
| 58 || June 8 || Phillies || 0–10 || Nola (4–4) || Houser (3–6) || — || 29,353 || 33–25 || L5
|-style=background:#fcc
| 59 || June 9 || Phillies || 3–8 || Domínguez (3–1) || Burnes (3–4) || — || 27,306 || 33–26 || L6
|-style=background:#fcc
| 60 || June 10 || @ Nationals || 5–11 || Fedde (4–4) || Ashby (1–5) || — || 26,111 || 33–27 || L7
|-style=background:#fcc
| 61 || June 11 || @ Nationals || 6–8 || Corbin (3–8) || Lauer (5–2) || — || 25,265 || 33–28 || L8
|-style=background:#bfb
| 62 || June 12 || @ Nationals || 4–1 || Milner (3–1) || Espino (0–1) || Hader (19) || 22,549 || 34–28 || W1
|-style=background:#fcc
| 63 || June 14 || @ Mets || 0–4 || Bassitt (5–4) || Houser (3–7) || — || 28,495 || 34–29 || L1
|-style=background:#bfb
| 64 || June 15 || @ Mets || 10–2 || Burnes (4–4) || Peterson (3–1) || — || 25,422 || 35–29 || W1
|-style=background:#fcc
| 65 || June 16 || @ Mets || 4–5 || Smith (1–1) || Suter (1–1) || Díaz (13) || 25,002 || 35–30 || L1
|-style=background:#bfb
| 66 || June 17 || @ Reds || 5–4 || Lauer (6–2) || Detwiler (0–1) || Boxberger (1) || 21,147 || 36–30 || W1
|-style=background:#bfb
| 67 || June 18 || @ Reds || 7–3 || Alexander (1–0) || Ashcraft (3–1) || — || 25,071 || 37–30 || W2
|-style=background:#bfb
| 68 || June 19 || @ Reds || 6–3 || Houser (4–7) || Minor (1–3) || Williams (5) || 25,001 || 38–30 || W3
|-style=background:#bfb
| 69 || June 20 || Cardinals || 2–0 || Burnes (5–4) || Nikolas (5–5) || Hader (20) || 28,100 || 39–30 || W4
|-style=background:#fcc
| 70 || June 21 || Cardinals || 2–6 || Thompson (1–0) || Gonzalez (0–1) || — || 30,208 || 39–31 || L1
|-style=background:#fcc
| 71 || June 22 || Cardinals || 4–5 || Oviedo (1–1) || Lauer (6–3) || Cabrera (1) || 27,986 || 39–32 || L2
|-style=background:#bfb
| 72 || June 23 || Cardinals || 6–4 || Alexander (2–0) || Hudson (5–4) || Hader (21) || 32,550 || 40–32 || W1
|-style=background:#fcc
| 73 || June 24 || Blue Jays || 4–9 || Manoah (9–2) || Houser (4–8) || — || 32,166 || 40–33 || L1
|-style=background:#bfb
| 74 || June 25 || Blue Jays || 5–4 || Burnes (6–4) || Kikuchi (2–4) || Hader (22) || 34,768 || 41–33 || W1
|-style=background:#bfb
| 75 || June 26 || Blue Jays || 10–3 || Gustave (1–0) || Berríos (5–4) || — || 35,503 || 42–33 || W2
|-style=background:#bfb
| 76 || June 28 || @ Rays || 5–3 || Woodruff (6–3) || Wisler (2–2) || Hader (23) || 13,742 || 43–33 || W3
|-style=background:#bfb
| 77 || June 29 || @ Rays || 5–3 || Boxberger (2–1) || Faucher (1–2) || Hader (24) || 15,481 || 44–33 || W4
|-style=background:#fcc
| 78 || June 30 || @ Pirates || 7–8 || Brubaker (2–7) || Suter (1–2) || De Los Santos (2) || 14,134 || 44–34 || L1
|-

|-style=background:#bfb
| 79 || July 1 || @ Pirates || 19–2 || Burnes (7–4) || Contreras (2–2) || — || 20,409 || 45–34 || W1
|-style=background:#fcc
| 80 || July 2 || @ Pirates || 4–7 || Wilson (1–4) || Ashby (1–6) || Bednar (12) || 26,505 || 45–35 || L1
|-style=background:#bfb
| 81 || July 3 || @ Pirates || 2–0 || Woodruff (7–3) || Thompson (3–6) || Hader (25) || 17,578 || 46–35 || W1
|-style=background:#bfb
| 82 || July 4 || Cubs || 5–2  || Boxberger (3–1) || Effross (1–4) || — || 41,981 || 47–35 || W2
|-style=background:#fcc
| 83 || July 5 || Cubs || 3–8 || Swarmer (2–3) || Alexander (2–1) || — || 30,561 || 47–36 || L1
|-style=background:#fcc
| 84 || July 6 || Cubs || 1–2 || Givens (5–0) || Hader (0–2) || Robertson (12) || 32,696 || 47–37 || L2
|-style=background:#bfb
| 85 || July 8 || Pirates || 4–3 || Ashby (2–6) || Brubaker (2–8) || Hader (26) || 29,471 || 48–37 || W1
|-style=background:#fcc
| 86 || July 9 || Pirates || 3–4 || De Jong (4–0) || Boxberger (3–2) || Bednar (15) || 35,384 || 48–38 || L1
|-style=background:#fcc
| 87 || July 10 || Pirates || 6–8 || Stratton (5–4) || Gott (1–2) || — || 32,967 || 48–39 || L2
|-style=background:#bfb
| 88 || July 12 || @ Twins || 6–3 || Gustave (2–0) || Winder (4–3) || Hader (27) || 37,183 || 49–39 || W1
|-style=background:#fcc
| 89 || July 13 || @ Twins || 1–4 || Durán (1–3) || Hader (0–3) || — || 38,802 || 49–40 || L1
|-style=background:#bfb
| 90 || July 14 || @ Giants || 3–2  || Gott (2–2) || Doval (3–5) || Williams (6) || 26,994 || 50–40 || W1
|-style=background:#fcc
| 91 || July 15 || @ Giants || 5–8 || Long (1–2) || Hader (0–4) || — || 28,244 || 50–41 || L1
|-style=background:#fcc
| 92 || July 16 || @ Giants || 1–2 || Brebbia (5–1) || Suter (1–3) || Leone (2) || 41,279 || 50–42 || L2
|-style=background:#fcc
| 93 || July 17 || @ Giants || 5–9 || Webb (9–3) || Ashby (2–7) || — || 30,584 || 50–43 || L3
|-style=background:#bcf
| ASG || July 19 || AL @ NL || 3–2 || Valdez (1–0) || Gonsolin (0–1) || Clase (1) || 52,518 || N/A || N/A
|-style=background:#bfb
| 94 || July 22 || Rockies || 6–5  || Suter (2–3) || Bird (1–2) || — || 33,357 || 51–43 || W1
|-style=background:#bfb
| 95 || July 23 || Rockies || 9–4 || Woodruff (8–3) || Ureña (1–2) || — || 31,694 || 52–43 || W2
|-style=background:#bfb
| 96 || July 24 || Rockies || 10–9 || Suter (3–3) || Colomé (2–3) || Hader (28) || 36,465 || 53–43 || W3
|-style=background:#fcc
| 97 || July 25 || Rockies || 0–2 || Freeland (5–7) || Ashby (2–8) || Bard (21) || 25,194 || 53–44 || L1
|-style=background:#bfb
| 98 || July 26 || Twins || 7–6 || Hader (1–4) || Duffey (2–4) || — || 28,596 || 54–44 || W1
|-style=background:#bfb
| 99 || July 27 || Twins || 10–4 || Burnes (8–4) || Archer (2–5) || — || 35,914 || 55–44 || W2
|-style=background:#bfb
| 100 || July 29 || @ Red Sox || 4–1 || Woodruff (9–3) || Bello (0–3) || Hader (29) || 34,193 || 56–44 || W3
|-style=background:#bfb
| 101 || July 30 || @ Red Sox || 9–4 || Lauer (7–3) || Pivetta (8–8) || — || 35,867 || 57–44 || W4
|-style=background:#fcc
| 102 || July 31 || @ Red Sox || 2–7 || Winckowski (4–5) || Ashby (2–9) || — || 35,231 || 57–45 || L1
|-style=background:#
|-

|-style=background:#fcc
| 103 || August 2 || @ Pirates || 3–5 || Holderman (5–0) || Burnes (8–5) || Crowe (3) || 12,401 || 57–46 || L2
|-style=background:#fcc
| 104 || August 3 || @ Pirates || 7–8 || Crowe (4–6) || Williams (2–1) || — || 13,084 || 57–47 || L3
|-style=background:#fcc
| 105 || August 4 || @ Pirates || 4–5  || Underwood Jr. (1–3) || Bush (2–2) || — || 13,485 || 57–48 || L4
|-style=background:#bfb
| 106 || August 5 || Reds || 5–1 || Lauer (8–3) || Dugger (0–1) || Williams (7) || 33,239 || 58–48 || W1
|-style=background:#fcc
| 107 || August 6 || Reds || 5–7 || Farmer (1–1) || Ashby (2–10) || — || 35,784 || 59–48 || L1
|-style=background:#fcc
| 108 || August 7 || Reds || 2–4  || Strickland (3–3) || Williams (2–2) || Detwiler (1) || 40,063 || 58–50 || L2
|-style=background:#bfb
| 109 || August 9 || Rays || 5–3 || Peralta (4–2) || Yarbrough (0–7) || Bush (2) || 30,030 || 59–50 || W1
|-style=background:#bfb
| 110 || August 10 || Rays || 4–3  || Williams (3–2) || Thompson (3–3) || — || 30,644 || 60–50 || W2
|-style=background:#fcc
| 111 || August 12 || @ Cardinals || 1–3 || Montgomery (5–3) || Lauer (8–4) || Helsley (12) || 45,669 || 60–51 || L1
|-style=background:#bfb
| 112 || August 13 || @ Cardinals || 3–2  || Williams (4–2) || Gallegos (2–5) || Bush (3) || 45,905 || 61–51 || W1
|-style=background:#fcc
| 113 || August 14 || @ Cardinals || 3–6 || Mikolas (9–9) || Rogers (1–6) || — || 44,142 || 61–52 || L1
|-style=background:#fcc
| 114 || August 15 || Dodgers || 0–4 || Urías (13–6) || Peralta (4–3) || — || 27,084 || 61–53 || L2
|-style=background:#bfb
| 115 || August 16 || Dodgers || 5–4  || Suter (4–3) || Kimbrel (3–5) || — || 32,948 || 62–53 || W1
|-style=background:#fcc
| 116 || August 17 || Dodgers || 1–2 || Gonsolin (15–1) || Lauer (8–5) || Kimbrel (21) || 30,259 || 62–54 || L1
|-style=background:#bfb
| 117 || August 18 || Dodgers || 5–3 || Burnes (9–5) || Heaney (1–1) || Williams (8) || 27,403 || 63–54 || W1
|-style=background:#fcc
| 118 || August 19 || @ Cubs || 7–8 || Rucker (2–1) || Milner (3–2) || Hughes (2) || 39,962 || 63–55 || L1
|-style=background:#fcc
| 119 || August 20 || @ Cubs || 5–6  || Uelmen (2–1) || Strzelecki (1–1) || — || 35,994 || 63–56 || L2
|-style=background:#bfb
| 120 || August 21 || @ Cubs || 5–2 || Suter (5–3) || Wick (3–6) || Rogers (29) || 34,525 || 64–56 || W1
|-style=background:#bfb
| 121 || August 22 || @ Dodgers || 4–0 || Lauer (9–5) || Urías (13–7) || — || 37,091 || 65–56 || W2
|-style=background:#fcc
| 122 || August 23 || @ Dodgers || 1–10 || Gonsolin (16–1) || Burnes (9–6) || — || 53,222 || 65–57 || L1
|-style=background:#fcc
| 123 || August 24 || @ Dodgers || 6–12 || Heaney (2–1) || Houser (4–9) || — || 47,216 || 65–58 || L2
|-style=background:#fcc
| 124 || August 26 || Cubs || 3–4  || Newcomb (2–0) || Williams (4–3) || Rodríguez (1) || 33,549 || 65–59 || L3
|-style=background:#bfb
| 125 || August 27 || Cubs || 7–0 || Rogers (2–6) || Wick (4–7) || — || 40,901 || 66–59 || W1
|-style=background:#bfb
| 126 || August 28 || Cubs || 9–7 || Lauer (10–5) || Newcomb (2–1) || Williams (9) || 39,035 || 67–59 || W2
|-style=background:#bfb
| 127 || August 29 || Pirates || 7–5 || Williams (5–3) || Crowe (5–8) || — || 23,009 || 68–59 || W3
|-style=background:#fcc
| 128 || August 30 || Pirates || 2–4 || Bañuelos (1–1) || Boxberger (3–3) || De Jong (1) || 24,764 || 68–60 || L1
|-style=background:#bfb
| 129 || August 31 || Pirates || 6–1 || Rogers (3–6) || Yajure (1–1) || — || 25,240 || 69–60 || W1
|-

|-style=background:#fcc
| 130 || September 1 || @ Diamondbacks || 0–5 || Kelly (12–5) || Woodruff (9–4) || — || 10,495 || 69–61 || L1
|-style=background:#fcc
| 131 || September 2 || @ Diamondbacks || 1–2 || Nelson (2–0) || Lauer (10–6) || Kennedy (10) || 13,488 || 69–62 || L2
|-style=background:#bfb
| 132 || September 3 || @ Diamondbacks || 8–6  || Williams (6–3) || Mantiply (2–5) || Rogers (30) || 22,138 || 70–62 || W1
|-style=background:#fcc
| 133 || September 4 || @ Diamondbacks || 1–5 || Gallen (11–2) || Alexander (2–2) || — || 20,274 || 70–63 || L1
|-style=background:#bfb
| 134 || September 5 || @ Rockies || 6–4 || Houser (5–9) || Feltner (2–7) || Williams (10) || 32,627 || 71–63 || W1
|-style=background:#fcc
| 135 || September 6 || @ Rockies || 7–10  || Bard (4–4) || Rogers (3–7) || — || 22,329 || 71–64 || L1
|-style=background:#fcc
| 136 || September 7 || @ Rockies || 4–8 || Freeland (8–9) || Lauer (10–7) || — || 20,278 || 71–65 || L2
|-style=background:#bfb 
| 137 || September 8  || Giants || 2–1 || Burnes (10–6) || Junis (4–5) || Williams (11) ||  || 72–65 || W1
|-style=background:#bfb
| 138 || September 8  || Giants || 4–2 || Strzelecki (2–1) || Young (0–1) || Rogers (31) || 23,019 || 73–65 || W2
|-style=background:#fcc
| 139 || September 9 || Reds || 2–8 || Lodolo (4–5) || Alexander (2–3) || — || 33,660 || 73–66 || L1
|-style=background:#bfb
| 140 || September 10 || Reds || 5–1 || Houser (6–9) || Anderson (0–3) || — || 34,615 || 74–66 || W1
|-style=background:#bfb
| 141 || September 11 || Reds || 7–6 || Woodruff (10–4) || Dunn (1–3) || Williams (12) || 42,482 || 75–66 || W2
|-style=background:#bfb
| 142 || September 13 || @ Cardinals || 8–4 || Perdomo (2–0) || Montgomery (8–4) || — || 42,047 || 76–66 || W3
|-style=background:#fcc
| 143 || September 14 || @ Cardinals || 1–4 || Wainwright (11–9) || Burnes (10–7) || Helsley (17) || 46,459 || 76–67 || L1
|-style=background:#bfb
| 144 || September 16 || Yankees || 7–6 || Rogers (4–7) || Holmes (6–4) || — || 36,011 || 77–67 || W1
|-style=background:#bfb
| 145 || September 17 || Yankees || 4–1 || Woodruff (11–4) || Taillon (13–5) || Williams (13) || 41,210 || 78–67 || W2
|-style=background:#fcc
| 146 || September 18 || Yankees || 8–12 || Cole (12–7) || Milner (3–3) || — || 35,964 || 78–68 || L1
|-style=background:#fcc
| 147 || September 19 || Mets || 2–7 || Scherzer (10–4) || Burnes (10–8) || — || 25,671 || 78–69 || L2
|-style=background:#fcc
| 148 || September 20 || Mets || 5–7 || Rodríguez (2–4) || Rogers (4–8) || Díaz (31) || 26,319 || 78–70 || L3
|-style=background:#bfb
| 149 || September 21 || Mets || 6–0 || Gott (3–2) || Walker (12–5) || — || 25,204 || 79–70 || W1
|-style=background:#bfb
| 150 || September 22 || @ Reds || 5–1 || Woodruff (12–4) || Greene (4–13) || — || 9,889 || 80–70 || W2
|-style=background:#bfb
| 151 || September 23 || @ Reds || 5–3 || Perdomo (3–0) || Cessa (4–4) || Williams (14) || 16,658 || 81–70 || W3
|-style=background:#bfb
| 152 || September 24 || @ Reds || 10–2 || Burnes (11–8) || Ashcraft (5–4) || — || 20,472 || 82–70 || W4
|-style=background:#fcc
| 153 || September 25 || @ Reds || 1–2 || Farmer (2–1) || Bush (2–3) || Díaz (9) || 19,952 || 82–71 || L1
|-style=background:#fcc
| 154 || September 27 || Cardinals || 2–6 || Mikolas (12–13) || Houser (6–10) || — || 29,341 || 82–72 || L2
|-style=background:#bfb
| 155 || September 28 || Cardinals || 5–1 || Woodruff (13–4) || Quintana (6–7) || — || 28,835 || 83–72 || W1
|-style=background:#fcc
| 156 || September 29 || Marlins || 2–4 || Nance (1–3) || Peralta (4–4) || Floro (9) || 23,122 || 83–73 || L1
|-style=background:#bfb
| 157 || September 30 || Marlins || 1–0 || Burnes (12–8) || Alcántara (14–9) || Williams (15) || 31,945 || 84–73 || W1
|-

|-style=background:#fcc
| 158 || October 1 || Marlins || 3–4 || Nance (2–3) || Williams (6–4) || Bleier (1) || 30,686 || 84–74 || L1
|-style=background:#fcc
| 159 || October 2 || Marlins || 3–4  || Brazobán (1–1) || Gott (3–3) || Scott (20) || 31,053 || 84–75 || L2
|-style=background:#bfb
| 160 || October 3 || Diamondbacks || 6–5  || Boxberger (4–3) || Moronta (2–2) || — || 18,612 || 85–75 || W1
|-style=background:#bfb
| 161 || October 4 || Diamondbacks || 3–0 || Lauer (11–7) || Gallen (12–4) || Strzelecki (1) || 19,611 || 86–75 || W2
|-style=background:#fcc
| 162 || October 5 || Diamondbacks || 2–4 || Poppen (2–2) || Gott (3–4) || Ginkel (1) || 18,765 || 86–76 || L1
|-

|- style="text-align:center;"
| Legend:       = Win       = Loss       = PostponementBold = Brewers team member

Statistics

Batting 
(Final Stats)
Players in bold are on the active roster.
Note: G = Games played; AB = At bats; R = Runs; H = Hits; 2B = Doubles; 3B = Triples; HR = Home runs; RBI = Runs batted in; SB = Stolen bases; BB = Walks; K = Strikeouts; AVG = Batting average; OBP = On-base percentage; SLG = Slugging percentage; TB = Total bases

Source

Pitching 
(through October 5, 2022)
Players in bold are on the active roster.
Note: W = Wins; L = Losses; ERA = Earned run average; WHIP = Walks plus hits per inning pitched; G = Games pitched; GS = Games started; SV = Saves; IP = Innings pitched; H = Hits allowed; R = Runs allowed; ER = Earned runs allowed; BB = Walks allowed; K = Strikeouts

Source

Farm system

The Brewers' farm system consisted of eight minor league affiliates in 2022.

References

External links
2022 Milwaukee Brewers season at Baseball Reference
Milwaukee Brewers Schedule 

Milwaukee Brewers seasons
Milwaukee Brewers
Milwaukee Brewers